Fresh Start is the first studio album by Ryan Stevenson. Gotee Records released the album on September 18, 2015. A new version of the album was released in 2016, including 2 bonus tracks: "Holding Nothing Back" and "Eye Of The Storm (Radio Version)".

Critical reception

Awarding the album four stars from CCM Magazine, Andy Argyrakis states, "each of the ten tunes deliver when it comes to mouth-watering sounds and faith fortification". Christopher Smith, giving the album three stars at Jesus Freak Hideout, writes, "Fresh Start is well-produced, catchy, and has an encouraging message of God's love." Signaling in a four star review by New Release Today, Caitlin Lassiter responds, "Fresh Start solidifies Ryan Stevenson's place in the industry. A well-rounded album overall, Ryan has crafted a successful first full length effort with his work here. While a bit more diversity in sound would be nice, what Ryan has done in Fresh Start creates a successful a debut." Rating the album four and a half stars for The Christian Beat, Herb Longs says, "This album is a perfect example of what can transpire when powerful lyrics meet a passionate voice and excellent production." Joshua Andre, indicating in a three and a half star review by 365 Days of Inspiring Media, describes, "Fresh Start by Ryan Stevenson isn't perfect, as there are a couple of tracks that are a bit misplaced, either lyrically or musically."

Track listing

Charts

References

2015 albums
Gotee Records albums